Burial of Saint Lucy is a painting by the Italian artist Caravaggio. It is located in the church of Santa Lucia al Sepolcro in Syracuse, Sicily.

History
According to The Golden Legend, Saint Lucy had bestowed her wealth on the poor, in gratitude for the miraculous healing of her mother. Denounced as a Christian by her own suitor who wrongly suspected her of infidelity, she refused to recant, offered her chastity to Christ, and was sentenced to be dragged to a brothel. Miraculously, nothing could move her or displace her from the spot where she stood. She was pierced by a knife in the throat and, where she fell, the church of Santa Lucia al Sepolcro in Syracuse was built.

Caravaggio had escaped from prison on Malta in 1608, fleeing to Syracuse. There his Roman companion Mario Minniti helped him get a commission for the present altarpiece. Caravaggio painted it in 1608, for the Franciscan church of Santa Lucia al Sepolcro. The choice of subject was driven by the fact that St. Lucy was the patron saint of Syracuse and had been interred below the church. The subject was unusual, but especially important to the local authorities, who were eager to reinforce the local cult of St. Lucy, which had sustained a setback with the theft of her remains during the Middle Ages.

Style
The similarities of the painting with Caravaggio's Resurrection of Lazarus has been pointed out and the scholar Howard Hibbard has spoken of the "powerful emptiness" of the final rendered version of the painting.

See also
List of paintings by Caravaggio

References

External links

1608 paintings
Paintings by Caravaggio
Paintings about death
Christian art about death
Religious paintings
Paintings in Sicily
Paintings of Saint Lucy